is an urban expressway in Nagoya, Japan. It is a part of the Nagoya Expressway network and is owned and operated by Nagoya Expressway Public Corporation.

Route description
The route originates from a junction with the Ring Route and extends westward; Route 2 also originates from this same point and extends eastward. The route eventually terminates at a junction with the Higashi-Meihan Expressway.

The expressway is 4 lanes for its entire length.

History
During the COVID-19 pandemic, six tollgates were closed along the Manba and Tōkai routes after a tollgate operator was found to be infected with the virus.

Interchange list

 JCT - junction, TB - toll gate

References

External links
 Nagoya Expressway Public Corporation

Nagoya Expressway